Peperomia rotundifolia, also known as jade necklace, trailing jade, creeping buttons and round leaf Peperomia, is a trailing plant species of peperomia native to the tropical rainforest of South America. The first European to describe it was Carl von Linné, and got its current name from Carl Sigismund Kunth.

Subspecies 
In addition to the nominate form, there are also the subspecies, ovata, pilosior, subelliptica, subglabrilimba and obcordata.

Characteristics
It has hanging shoots and very small, thick and fleshy, succulent, button-like leaves that may entwine and weave in and out of each other.

Habitat
An epiphyte, the plant grows in tropical forests in North and South America on trees and can also be found crawling on rock cracks, rotten logs and the forest ground as well, preferring moisture and shaded conditions. Their USDA hardiness zone is 10a to 11b: from 30 °F (−1.1 °C) to 50 °F (+10 °C).

Cultivation
The plant does best in hanging baskets, where it can cascade and also in terrariums. The species require high humidity, especially when it is warm, though they are very sensitive to overwatering, where they would wilt or have scab-like bumps on their leaves. They grow well in steadily moist soils. Summer temperatures should exceed 24 °C and in winter it should not be lower than 16 °C.

The plant flourishes when it is slightly pot-bound, meaning they should not be over-potted. The plant can be easily propagated from leaf cuttings. They may be susceptible to mealybugs.

References

External links
Trailing Jade care

Epiphytes
House plants
rotundifolia
Flora of Brazil
Flora of Ecuador
Flora of Peru